The Ballad of Riverboat Bill is a 1965 Australian TV series set on the Murray River in the 1890s.

References

Australian Broadcasting Corporation original programming
Australian drama television series
1965 Australian television series debuts
English-language television shows
Black-and-white Australian television shows
Australian children's television series